Leopold Victor "Leo" Rucka (August 18, 1931 – January 4, 2016) was an American professional football player who played Linebacker/Center for the San Francisco 49ers during the 1956 NFL season. He was drafted in the 2nd round of the 1954 NFL Draft.

He was picked 23rd overall out of 360 draft picks in the 1954 draft. Leo was born in Wooster, an area of Baytown, TX, on August 18, 1931, and graduated from Crosby High School (Texas) in 1950, where he excelled in football, basketball, and all other major sports. He was a resident of Crosby, TX. He was Married to his wife of over 60 years, Lillian Rucka. They had 5 children, 11 grandchildren, and several great grandchildren. He attended College at Rice University and was inducted into the Rice Football Hall of Fame in 1996. 

During his senior year at Rice, Leo helped the Rice Owls defeat the University of Texas in the final seconds for the Southwest Conference title. He described it as his "biggest college thrill". He also co-captained the team the season they won the Cotton Bowl Championship in 1954 against Alabama. He played in 5 NFL games, He had 1 documented fumble recovery, tackle data is not available from that year. Leo left the NFL to fulfill Army obligations as an aviation engineer. He served in Far East during the Korean War for 20 months. He was named to the All-Service Team. During his time in the NFL he was 6'3", 212 lbs. His teammates nicknamed him "The Quiet Man". Rucka died on January 4, 2016.

References

1931 births
2016 deaths
Rice Owls football players
San Francisco 49ers players
Sportspeople from Harris County, Texas
People from Baytown, Texas
People from Crosby, Texas